The 2014 London municipal election was held on October 27, 2014 in London, Ontario, Canada, to elect the Mayor of London, London City Council and the Thames Valley District School Board, London District Catholic School Board, Conseil scolaire catholique Providence and Conseil scolaire Viamonde. The election was held in conjunction with the province-wide 2014 municipal elections.

Timeline
 January 2: Nomination period begins
 September 12: Nomination period ends
 September 15: List of candidates elected by acclamation released.
 October 11: Advanced Ballot voting begins
 October 18: Advanced Ballot voting ends
 October 27: Election Day

Election results
Official List of Candidates

Names in bold denotes elected candidates. 
(X) denotes incumbent.

Mayor
One candidate to be elected.

Councillors
One candidate per ward to be elected.

Ward 1

Ward 2

Ward 3

Ward 4

Ward 5

Ward 6

Ward 7

Ward 8

Ward 9

Ward 10

Ward 11

Ward 12

Ward 13

Ward 14

Withdrawn Candidates
 On October 14, Roger Caranci announced that he would step down from his mayoral campaign and put his support behind candidate Paul Cheng. The official deadline to drop out of the mayoral race was Sept 12, Caranci's name remained on the ballot on election day.

Incumbents Not Seeking Re-Election
 Joni Baechler, interim Mayor
 Joe Swan, Ward 3 Councillor (ran for mayor)
 Russ Monteith, interim Ward 5 Councillor
 Nancy Branscombe, Ward 6 Councillor
 Matt Brown, Ward 7 Councillor (ran for mayor)
 Dale Henderson, Ward 9 Councillor
 Judy Bryant, Ward 13 Councillor

Thames Valley District School Board

Wards 1, 11, 12 & 14
Two candidates to be elected.

Wards 2, 3, 4, 5 & 6
Two candidates to be elected.

Wards 7, 8, 9, 10 & 13
Two candidates to be elected.

London District Catholic School Board

Wards 1 & 14
One candidate to be elected.

Wards 2, 3 & 4
One candidate to be elected.

Wards 5, 6 & 7
One candidate to be elected.

Wards 8, 9 & 10
One candidate to be elected.

Wards 11, 12 & 13
One candidate to be elected.

Conseil scolaire catholique Providence
One candidate to be elected for the entire geographic area consisting of the City of London, the County of Middlesex, and the County of Elgin.

City of London results only.

Conseil scolaire Viamonde
One candidate to be elected for the entire geographic area of the Regional Municipality of Waterloo, the County of Wellington, the County of Middlesex, the County of Perth, and the County of Huron.

City of London results only.

References

London
Municipal elections in London, Ontario